The Alpha School District is a comprehensive community public school district that serves students in pre-kindergarten through eighth grade from Alpha, in Warren County, New Jersey, United States.

As of the 2018–19 school year, the district, comprising one school, had an enrollment of 211 students and 24.5 classroom teachers (on an FTE basis), for a student–teacher ratio of 8.6:1. In the 2016–17 school year, Alpha had the 42nd smallest enrollment of any school district in the state, with 194 students.

The district is classified by the New Jersey Department of Education as being in District Factor Group "B", the second lowest of eight groupings. District Factor Groups organize districts statewide to allow comparison by common socioeconomic characteristics of the local districts. From lowest socioeconomic status to highest, the categories are A, B, CD, DE, FG, GH, I and J.

Public school students in ninth through twelfth grades attend Phillipsburg High School in Phillipsburg, which serves students from Alpha as part of a sending/receiving relationship with the Phillipsburg School District. The high school also serves students from four other sending communities: Bloomsbury (in Hunterdon County), Greenwich Township, Lopatcong Township and Pohatcong Township. As of the 2018–19 school year, the high school had an enrollment of 1,650 students and 126.5 classroom teachers (on an FTE basis), for a student–teacher ratio of 13.0:1.

Schools
Schools in the district (with 2018–19 enrollment data from the National Center for Education Statistics) are:
Alpha School for K to grade 8 (205 students)

Administration
Core members of the districts' administration are:
Seth Cohen, Superintendent
Timothy Mantz, Business Administrator

Board of education
The district's board of education, comprised of nine members, sets policy and oversees the fiscal and educational operation of the district through its administration. As a Type II school district, the board's trustees are elected directly by voters to serve three-year terms of office on a staggered basis, with three seats up for election each year held (since 2012) as part of the November general election. The board appoints a superintendent to oversee the district's day-to-day operations and a business administrator to supervise the business functions of the district.

References

External links
Alpha School District

School Data for the Alpha School District, National Center for Education Statistics
Phillipsburg High School

Alpha, New Jersey
New Jersey District Factor Group B
School districts in Warren County, New Jersey
Public K–8 schools in New Jersey